Malcolm Robertson (7 July 1951 – 18 August 2010) was a Scottish footballer who played as a left winger. He made his mark playing for Penicuik Athletic when he appeared in the 1970 Scottish Junior Cup Final. He then moved to Raith Rovers, scoring 53 goals in 140 league appearances for the Kirkcaldy side.

Robertson went on to play for Ayr United, before Hearts signed him for a £25,000 fee in 1977. Hearts were battling with Ayr against relegation, but Robertson was sent off in a decisive match between the two teams. Hearts were a yo-yo club in the late 1970s and early 1980s; Robertson helped the club gain promotion back to the Premier Division in 1978 and 1980.

Robertson left Hearts in 1981 to play in Canada for Toronto Blizzard. He briefly returned to Scotland, playing for Dundee United and Hibernian. This preceded a final playing spell with Maltese side Hamrun Spartans. Robertson played just under 300 league matches during his twelve-year career.

His son, Sandy Robertson, played for Rangers in the 1990s.

References

External links 
 

1951 births
2010 deaths
Ayr United F.C. players
Scottish expatriate sportspeople in Malta
Dundee United F.C. players
Expatriate footballers in Malta
Expatriate soccer players in Canada
Association football wingers
Ħamrun Spartans F.C. players
Heart of Midlothian F.C. players
Hibernian F.C. players
North American Soccer League (1968–1984) players
Footballers from Edinburgh
Raith Rovers F.C. players
Scottish expatriate footballers
Scottish expatriate sportspeople in Canada
Scottish Football League players
Scottish footballers
Toronto Blizzard (1971–1984) players
Penicuik Athletic F.C. players